In the 1892 season, Somerset County Cricket Club played their sixth season of first-class cricket, and participated in the County Championship for the second season. They finished third in the competition, two positions higher than in the previous year. Their captain, Herbie Hewett, completed the season as the club's leading run-scorer, topping 1,000 runs in the Championship. The all-rounder Sammy Woods took the most wickets for the county, with 85. A match was also played against Oxford, which was won by the student team.

County Championship

Playing their second season as members of the County Championship, Somerset played sixteen matches, of which they won eight and lost five. Each of the final three matches of the season were curtailed by at least a day because of rain, and ended in draws.  Their performances were enough to rank them third among all counties in the standings, and in his history of Somerset cricket, David Foot describes it as the season that led to Somerset being taken seriously as a club. He praised the leadership of the club's captain, Herbie Hewett, who picked players on merit, rather than "the strength of his social charm and ability to drink into the early hours." Despite their general success, the county did suffer a heavy defeat to Lancashire in early August. After no play on the first day due to rain, Somerset lost the match on the second day, being bowled out twice for fewer than 100 runs. Against another northern county, they set a new record partnership for the first wicket in first-class cricket; Hewett and Lionel Palairet scored 346 runs together in three and a half hours against Yorkshire.

Season standings
Note: Pld = Played, W = Wins, L = Losses, D = Draws, Pts = Points.

Notes:
Team marked  won the County Championship.

Match log and statistics

University match

Notes and references

Bibliography
 
 

1892 in English cricket
English cricket seasons in the 19th century
Somerset County Cricket Club seasons